Myers Park High School is a public high school in Charlotte, North Carolina. It serves grades 9–12, and is a part of the Charlotte-Mecklenburg Schools district.

History
Myers Park High School opened in 1951. The school has a 62-acre campus with 13 buildings.

Athletics 
Myers Park High is a part of the North Carolina High School Athletic Association (NCHSAA) and is classified as a 4A school. Their team name is the "Mustangs" with their school colors being kelly green, white, and black.

Criticism
Multiple students have alleged administrative staff at Myers Park has "disregarded, victim-blamed and ultimately silenced" students who have come forward with allegations of sexual harassment and assault on the Myers Park campus. Mark Bosco, the former principal at Myers Park High School where the alleged sexual assault took place, was suspended with pay and later reassigned to an administrative position within the school district; this move was widely reported and criticized by students and their families.

Notable alumni
 Graham Tillett Allison, Jr., American political scientist and professor at the John F. Kennedy School of Government at Harvard University
 Rick Arrington, NFL quarterback
 Seth Avett, musician and founding member of the American folk-rock band The Avett Brothers
 Ben Browder, actor, writer, and film director
 Heather Childers, television news anchor
 Jim Crockett, Jr., professional wrestling promoter; ran Jim Crockett Promotions from 1973 to 1988
 Jack B. Farris, United States Army Lieutenant general
 Omar Gaither, NFL linebacker
 Phillip Goodrum, professional soccer player
 Lauren Holt, actress and comedian, former Saturday Night Live cast member
 Richard Hudson, United States Representative for North Carolina's 8th congressional district
 Drake Maye, football quarterback for the UNC Tar Heels
 Anna Kooiman, news anchor and television panelist
 Dan McCready, American entrepreneur and political candidate
 Ravi Patel, actor
 Mike Richey, former NFL offensive lineman
 Jake Robbins, MLB pitcher
 Paul Rousso, contemporary artist
 John Sadri, professional tennis player
 Tony Suarez, professional soccer player
 Kevin Trapp, professional soccer player
 Robert Woodard, college baseball head coach
 Haywoode Workman, former Indiana Pacers guard, current NBA referee

References

External links
 

International Baccalaureate schools in North Carolina
Public high schools in North Carolina
Educational institutions established in 1951
Schools in Charlotte, North Carolina
1951 establishments in North Carolina